Thomas G. Skinner was a sailor from Great Britain, who represented his country at the 1928 Summer Olympics in Amsterdam, Netherlands.

Sources
 

British male sailors (sport)
Sailors at the 1928 Summer Olympics – 8 Metre
Olympic sailors of Great Britain